Utility is a measure of the happiness or satisfaction gained from a good or service in economics and game theory.

Utility or Utilities may also refer to:

In computers
 Utility, a software program for a limited narrow specific task: see Utility software
 Software tool
 utility (C++), a header file in the C++ Standard Library

In economics
 Cardinal utility, a utility index that preserves preference orderings
 Marginal utility, the change in the utility from an increase in the consumption of a good or service

In philosophy
 Utilitarianism, philosophical theories that deal with utility

Other uses
 Public utility, an organization that maintains the infrastructure for a public service, or the services themselves
 Utilities (film), a 1981 movie starring Robert Hays
 Utility (patentability requirement), one of the requirements for patentability in Canadian and United States patent laws
 Utility (car), a term used in Australia and New Zealand to refer to a pickup truck or coupe utility vehicle ("ute")
 Utility player, a term used in sports for a player who can play several positions competently.
 Utility furniture, produced in the United Kingdom during and just after World War II, under a Government scheme designed to cope with shortages of raw materials and rationing
 Marine Corps Combat Utility Uniform, often abbreviated to "Utilities", the battledress uniform of the United States Marine Corps

See also